Boris Nikolayevich Ponomarev (17 January 1905 – 21 December 1995) was a Soviet politician, ideologist, historian and member of the Secretariat of the Communist Party of the Soviet Union. His patron in his rise to the Politburo was Mikhail Suslov.

His name would more accurately be transliterated as "Ponomaryov," though the form "Ponomarev" has become more frequent.

Career
From 1955 to 1986, Ponomarev was chief of the International Department of the CPSU Central Committee. He occupied an office within Central Committee headquarters until the 1991 August Coup, which he is said to have supported.

In 1962, Ponomarev wrote an updated state history of the CPSU to replace Stalin's 1938 The History of the Communist Party of the Soviet Union as part of the Khrushchev Thaw.

His December 1962 speech at the All-Union Conference of Historians was a major turning point in the development of Soviet historiography.

Publications
 Plot against the Soviet Union and world peace (1938)
Soviet Foreign Policy Vol. 1 1917 - 1945, edited with Anatoly Gromyko, Progress Publishers, 1980
History of Soviet Foreign Policy 1945-1970, edited with Anatoly Gromyko, Progress Publishers, 1974

References

External links

Russian Academy of Sciences: Profile

1905 births
1995 deaths
People from Zaraysky District
People from Zaraysky Uyezd
Politburo of the Central Committee of the Communist Party of the Soviet Union candidate members
Secretariat of the Central Committee of the Communist Party of the Soviet Union members
Fifth convocation members of the Supreme Soviet of the Soviet Union
Sixth convocation members of the Supreme Soviet of the Soviet Union
Seventh convocation members of the Supreme Soviet of the Soviet Union
Eighth convocation members of the Supreme Soviet of the Soviet Union
Ninth convocation members of the Supreme Soviet of the Soviet Union
Tenth convocation members of the Supreme Soviet of the Soviet Union
Eleventh convocation members of the Soviet of Nationalities
Members of the Supreme Soviet of the Russian Soviet Federative Socialist Republic, 1967–1971
Members of the Supreme Soviet of the Russian Soviet Federative Socialist Republic, 1971–1975
Members of the Supreme Soviet of the Russian Soviet Federative Socialist Republic, 1975–1980
Members of the Supreme Soviet of the Russian Soviet Federative Socialist Republic, 1980–1985
Members of the Supreme Soviet of the Russian Soviet Federative Socialist Republic, 1985–1990
Soviet historians
Labor historians
Historians of communism
Historians of Russia
Russian political scientists
Geopoliticians
Institute of Red Professors alumni
Full Members of the USSR Academy of Sciences
Full Members of the Russian Academy of Sciences
Lenin Prize winners
Heroes of Socialist Labour
Recipients of the Order of Lenin
Recipients of the Order of the Red Banner of Labour
Recipients of the Order of Georgi Dimitrov
20th-century political scientists